Gullah Jack (died July 12, 1822), also known as Couter Jack and sometimes referred to as "Gullah" Jack Pritchard, was a Methodist, an African conjurer, and a slave to Paul Pritchard in Charleston, South Carolina.

Background 
Little was known about his background, except that he was of Angolan origin and was shipped from Zanzibar to America under Zephaniah Kingsley's direction. He was sent first to Florida, to the Kingsley Plantation. However, in 1812 after a Seminole raid on the Kingsley Plantation, he escaped to Charleston, South Carolina where he was eventually purchased by Paul Pritchard in 1821.

Role in the 1822 Slave Revolt 
Gullah Jack is historically known for his role as a co-conspirator, along with Denmark Vesey, in planning the large slave rebellion that would become known as Denmark Vesey's slave conspiracy, in 1822. Both Vesey and Gullah Jack were involved in some capacity with the AME Church in Charleston. It was at the AME Church that Vesey recruited Gullah Jack for his planned uprising in Charleston.

Using his Africa-based influences, Gullah Jack was crucial in recruiting African-born slaves as soldiers and provided them with charms as protection against the "buckra" (whites). He is also said to have used his spiritual powers to terrify others into keeping silent about the conspiracy. Historians believe Jack's strong African culture, contrasted against Vesey's preaching, helped attract many of the slaves that joined the revolt.

The Vesey plot involved taking over the state armory to arm slaves from rural areas and the local sea islands, who would rise up and assist the others in revolt.  The slaves would then kill the whites of Charleston, take the city, and finally use the city's ships to escape, supposedly, to Haiti, where slaves had overthrown the white government and now ruled.

Eventually, the Vesey plot was leaked by other slaves that were coerced to confession. Gullah Jack was arrested for his part in the plot on July 5, 1822, and was tried for his role in the planning, along with 130 others.  Ultimately, South Carolina authorities hanged Vesey, Gullah Jack, and 34 other leading conspirators.

References

Bibliography
 Rodriguez, Junius P., The Historical encyclopedia of world slavery, Volume 1; Volume 7, ABC-CLIO, 1997,

External links
 Executions in the U.S. 1608-1987: The Espy File (by state) (PDF)
 Murrin, John M. & Johnson, Paul E. & McPherson, James M. & Gerstle, Gary & Rosenberg, Emily S. & Rosenberg, Norman L. (2002). Liberty Equality Power: A History of the American People Volume I: To 1877 (3rd ed.). Wadsworth: Thomson Learning. .
 Starobin, Robert S. "Terror in South Carolina 1822: An Introduction to Denmark Vesey & the Slave Conspiracy in Charleston". ChickenBones: A Journal, 5 October 2007.
 WGBH, "Sentence of Gullah Jack", Africans in America: part 3, PBS Online, 1998.

Year of birth missing
1822 deaths
Methodists from South Carolina
American people of Angolan descent
American rebel slaves
19th-century American slaves
19th-century executions by the United States
People executed by South Carolina by hanging
Executed African-American people
Executed Angolan people
19th-century executions of American people
1822 crimes in the United States
Hoodoo conjurors